"Spaceman" is a single by Dutch DJ and record producer Hardwell. It was released for digital download on 23 January 2012. A second version called "Call Me a Spaceman" featuring vocals by Dutch singer Mitch Crown and was released on 18 May 2012. Another vocal version was created in collaboration with Bright Lights. Despite Hardwell claiming that the latter was his favorite, his management decided to rather release "Call Me a Spaceman". Titled as "Mr. Spaceman" Bright Lights offered the track as a free download in late 2015. For "Spaceman"'s five-years anniversary he released the remastered Bright Lights version as "Mr. Spaceman (2017 edit)".

It is considered one of the most popular big room house songs of all-time along with "Animals" by Martin Garrix, "Epic" by Sandro Silva and Quintino, "Tsunami" by Dvbbs and Borgeous and "Tremor" by Martin Garrix and Dimitri Vegas & Like Mike.

A 2022 rework of the song, which had previously been uploaded exclusively on SoundCloud, was released on the deluxe edition of his album Rebels Never Die.

Music video 
On 18 May 2012, Hardwell uploaded the music video for "Call Me A Spaceman" on his YouTube account.

Track listing 
Digital download
"Spaceman" – 6:19

Digital download
"Call Me a Spaceman" (radio edit)  – 3:09
"Call Me a Spaceman" (extended mix)  – 6:19

Digital download (Carnage Festival Trap remix)
"Spaceman" (Carnage Festival Trap remix) – 3:54

Digital download – EP
"Spaceman" (original mix) – 6:19
"Spaceman" (Headhunterz remix) – 5:42
"Spaceman" (Drown the Fish remix) – 4:24
"Spaceman" (Naffz remix) – 4:35
"Call Me a Spaceman" (radio edit)  – 3:09
"Call Me a Spaceman" (extended mix)  – 6:19

Digital download (Outer Space remixes) – EP
"Spaceman" (Headhunterz remix) – 5:42
"Spaceman" (Drown the Fish remix) – 4:24
"Spaceman" (Naffz remix) – 4:35

Dr Phunk Remix
"Spaceman" (Dr Phunk Remix) – 3:42

Charts

Weekly charts

Year-end charts

Certifications

References 

2012 singles
2012 songs
Hardwell songs
Songs written by Hardwell